Marco Bernardi (born 2 January 1994) is a Sanmarinese football player who plays as a forward for Murata.

Career

Bernardi debuted with the senior national team on 29 March 2017 in a friendly against Moldova.

References

External links

1994 births
Living people
Sammarinese footballers
Association football forwards
S.S. Folgore Falciano Calcio players
San Marino international footballers
Campionato Sammarinese di Calcio players